Seoul Metropolitan City Route 30 is a trunk road located in Seoul, South Korea.

Stopovers
 Seoul
 Seocho District - Gangnam District - Seongdong District - Dongdaemun District - Seongbuk District

List of Facilities 
IS: Intersection, IC: Interchange

References

Roads in Seoul